Left and Democrats (LiD) was a centre-left electoral alliance of political parties in Poland which was created on 3 September 2006, before the Warsaw municipal election of 2006.  The coalition's aim was to provide an alternative for both Law and Justice and Civic Platform, which have been Poland's two major political parties since 2005. LiD contested their first national election in October, 2007 and won 53 seats to the Polish parliament, the Sejm. The LiD alliance was dissolved in April 2008, following a rift between the member parties.

Origins 

On September 15, 2006, the Coalition Election Committee was officially appointed under the name of "SLD+SdPl+PD+UP – Lewica i Demokraci" (containing the abbreviations for all the member parties as well as the name 'Leftists and Democrats'). The four member parties were:
Democratic Left Alliance (SLD), social-democratic
Social Democracy of Poland (SDPL), social-democratic
Labour Union (UP), social-democratic
Democratic Party – demokraci.pl (PD), social-liberal

At the beginning, the coalition was created only to enter candidates in regional councils. However, later it functioned during elections to many other, smaller units of local government, such as mayorships and town councils.

The September 2006 Agreement that founded the coalition accused the then incumbent government, led by the Law and Justice party, of causing an erosion of democracy in Poland. Wojciech Olejniczak, the chairman of Democratic Left Alliance, argued that the only true alternative to Law and Justice would be a coalition of the centre and left parties, alleging that Civic Platform, then the largest opposition party in the Polish Sejm, was too close politically to the Law and Justice Party.

The party's founding act also emphasized such elements as local government, Poland as part of an "open and modern Europe", protection of democratic institutions and separation of powers, opposition to a "closed" foreign policy, and support for pluralism and tolerance as the hallmarks of a democratic society.

Polish local elections, 2006

Platform 

Parties creating the coalition decided to follow three main principles in the lead up to the 2006 local elections:
 Civil and democratic local government – self-government authorities have to apply to their constitutional and legal principles completely and according to law. Powers of the local authority should be extended at the cost of the central – national authority.
Solidary in local government - actions, which are performed by self-government authorities should be based on the rule of social solidarity, based on the tenet that all citizens should have access to essential public services.
Clear and honest local government – local cliques, corruption, corrupt restrictions and violations of law in local government should be put to an end. Actions of the local authority should be clear and comprehensible to every citizen.

Candidates for Mayors

This table includes all candidates officially affiliated with, or supported by, the coalition in the 2006 local elections.

Comparison of the Results of the 2006 Elections

Polish parliamentary elections, 2007 

Although the coalition was initially conceived as a temporary electoral alliance for the 2006 local elections, cooperation between the parties continued, and on January 18, 2007, a Political Negotiating Committee headed by former Polish President Aleksander Kwaśniewski was created, for the purpose of clarifying a common centre-left political program.

The members of the Political Negotiating Committee were:
 Aleksander Kwaśniewski, former President of Poland (non-party)
 Wojciech Olejniczak, Chairman of the Democratic Left Alliance (SLD)
 Jerzy Szmajdziński, Chairman of SLD Parliamentary Caucus (SLD)
 Marek Borowski, Chairman of Social Democracy (SDPL)
 Waldemar Witkowski, Chairman of the Labour Union (UP)
 Janusz Onyszkiewicz, Chairman of the Democratic Party (PD)

LiD contested their first national elections in October, 2007. Aleksander Kwaśniewski led the campaign, as the nominal head of the coalition, and its candidate for Prime Minister.  LiD managed to take 13.2% of the national vote, and 53 seats, therefore achieving third place after the Civic Platform & Law and Justice parties, respectively. Of the 53 seats gained, the SLD took 37 seats, SDPL took 10, PD took 1, whilst non-party candidates took 5 seats (3 candidates were affiliated with the SLD and 2 affiliated with PD). The 4th coalition partner, the UP, did not win any seats.  LiD did not manage to elect any of its members to the upper house Senate.  Following the elections, LiD was not invited to participate in the coalition of the victorious Civic Platform with the agrarian Polish People's Party (PSL).  Nevertheless, LiD held some leverage in the new Sejm, as the government on occasion needed its votes to overturn presidential vetoes on government legislation. Kwaśniewski announced his resignation from the leadership of LiD, following the outcome of the election.

LiD Parliamentary parliamentary group (2007-2008)

Wojciech Olejniczak (SLD) - Parliamentary Chairman
Wacław Martyniuk (SLD) - Parliamentary Secretary
Jerzy Szmajdziński (SLD) - Vice-Marshall of the Sejm
Romuald Ajchler (SDPL)
Leszek Aleksandrzak (SLD)
Bartosz Arłukowicz (SDPL)
Marek Balicki (SDPL)
Anna Bańkowska (SDPL)
Anita Błochowiak (SLD)
Marek Borowski (SDPL)
Andrzej Celiński (SDPL)
Eugeniusz Czykwin (SLD)
Marian Filar (independent, affiliated with PD)
Tomasz Garbowski (SLD)
Witold Gintowt-Dziewałtowski (SLD)
Henryk Gołębiewski (SLD)
Tadeusz Iwiński (SLD)
Zdzisława Janowska (SDPL)
Izabela Jaruga-Nowacka (independent, affiliated with SLD)
Ryszard Kalisz (SLD)
Tomasz Kamiński (SLD)
Witold Klepacz (SLD)
Jan Kochanowski (SLD)
Sławomir Kopyciński (SLD)
Bożena Kotkowska (SDPL)
Janusz Krasoń (SLD)
Bogdan Lis (PD)
Krystyna Łybacka (SLD)
Zbigniew Matuszczak (SLD)
Jarosław Matwiejuk (independent, affiliated with SLD)
Krzysztof Matyjaszczyk (SLD)
Henryk Milcarz (SLD)
Tadeusz Motowidło (SLD)
Grzegorz Napieralski (SLD)
Artur Ostrowski (SLD)
Grzegorz Pisalski (SDPL)
Wojciech Pomajda (independent, affiliated with SLD)
Stanisława Prządka (SLD)
Stanisław Rydzoń (SLD)
Joanna Senyszyn (SLD)
Izabella Sierakowska (SDPL)
Stanisław Stec (SLD)
Elżbieta Streker-Dembińska (SLD)
Wiesław Szczepański (SLD)
Jolanta Szymanek-Deresz (SLD)
Tadeusz Tomaszewski (SLD)
Jerzy Wenderlich (SLD)
Jan Widacki (independent, affiliated with PD)
Marek Wikiński (SLD)
Bogusław Wontor (SLD)
Stanisław Wziątek (SLD)
Ryszard Zbrzyzny (SLD)
Janusz Zemke (SLD)

Dissolution 

There were several factors which led to the collapse of the LiD alliance. One of the issues was the internal disappointment with the alliance's performance in the 2007 elections. Some groups within the leading SLD party perceived that the main beneficiaries of the alliance were the SDPL and PD parties, whilst the SLD parliamentary representation dropped from 55 to 40 seats, when compared to the 2005 election. In the view of this group, SLD could have performed just as well or better outside of LiD. Another issue was the ideological and policy differences between the social-democratic parties (SLD, SDPL, UP) and the liberal-centrist PD. Whilst the social democrats were largely opposed to the proposed Missile Defence system project under negotiation between Poland and the U.S, the PD supported the move. The left also supported more liberal abortion laws and a more critical position of the Roman Catholic Church in Poland, whilst the PD had concerns with this direction. Furthermore, there were suspicions within the smaller parties (SDPL, PD) as to SLD's strength and domination of LiD, whilst many of SLD's rank and file members were unhappy with being in alliance with SDPL, which was an offshoot party created through a very public and divisive split within SLD in 2004.
On 29 March 2008, SLD leader Wojciech Olejniczak, surprised his allies by issuing a media release announcing that the alliance between SLD and PD was over, as the SLD was unable to work with PD any longer. This essentially meant that the SLD was ejecting PD from the LiD alliance, without having consulted them or the other constituent LiD parties.  This decision drew sharp criticism, not only from the PD, but also Aleksander Kwaśniewski, SDPL leader Marek Borowski and even from within the SLD itself. Olejniczak was one of the architects of LiD and one of its strongest defenders within the SLD. Commentators of the Polish political scene generally explain the motivation of the course of action taken by Olejniczak and his supporters, as relating to the impending battle for the leadership of the party at the SLD June party conference, between Olejniczak himself and the party general-secretary, Grzegorz Napieralski, who dominated the SLD left-wing and was known for his LiD-sceptic views.
Although Olejniczak indicated his hope that the LiD parliamentary caucus would remain intact irrespective of the LiD/PD split, on April 1, the 3 PD parliamentarians left the LiD caucus, to form a separate parliamentary group.  After the SDPL leadership consulted on how that party should respond to the crisis within LiD, Borowski announced his party's support for a resumption of talks between all parties, with the aim of rebuilding LiD, to the satisfaction of all parties concerned. This proposal was rejected by the SLD, and consequently, on 19 April Borowski announced his party's withdrawal from LiD. On 23 April, 8 out of 10 SDPL's M.P's, left the LiD caucus, to form the separate grouping called SDPL-New Left (SDPL-Nowa Lewica).  The remainder of LiD M.P's (40 from SLD and 2 from SDPL) renamed themselves "Lewica" - The Left, and the LiD alliance formally came to an end.

External links 
 Platform of 'Agreement of the Left and Democrats'
Vocation Act
Official site of Democratic Left Alliance (SLD)
Official site of Labour Union (UP)
Official site of Social Democracy of Poland (SdPl)
Official site of Democratic Party (PD)
Centrolew.pl

References

2006 establishments in Poland
2008 disestablishments in Poland
Defunct political party alliances in Poland
Defunct social democratic parties in Poland
Democratic Left Alliance
Liberal parties in Poland
Political parties disestablished in 2008
Political parties established in 2006
Social liberal parties